Los Warahuaco is a Colombian musical group and one of the most recognized in the field of tropical music.

History 
Founded in Cartago (Valle del Cauca) in 1982 by Hernán Rojas, when he returned to Colombia after twenty-seven years of musical career in Argentina with the group Los Wawancó. His first public presentation was made on August 7 of the same year in the city of Pereira. There they participated in the first Festival of Orchestras that was realized like part of the program of the celebrations. A year later Los Warahuaco won the second Festival of Orchestras and made their first tour to the United States and Canada, a tour that would repeat on several occasions and alternate with presentations in Colombia and Ecuador.

In eighties they had great successes in markets like Mexico, Peru, Paraguay, Uruguay, the United States, Venezuela, Ecuador, Chile and of course Colombia, with songs such as "El pescador de Barú", a song that has been called the hymn of tropical music, "El canoero", "Enamorando", "He nacido para amarte", and “El piragüero", among many others. Years later Los Warahuaco are known in the European market having a great reception in countries like Spain and France.

In 1996 the song La Tuna was nominated for Song of the Cali Fair and a year later it was chosen as the Official Song of the Cartago Festival.

In the year 2000 a tour was realized in France and in the first months of 2001 a new tour in the United States took place.

In 2001, after the death of Hernán Rojas, on October 7 of that year, his wife, Victoria Eugenia Gómez, was responsible for giving continuity to the group. In this way, Los Warahuaco continued its musical activity in an uninterrupted way with frequent presentations at the main fairs and festivals in Colombia such as the Cali Fair, the Manizales Fair, the Blacks and Whites' Carnival, among others.

In 2004 Los Warahuaco traveled back to Europe, this time to perform in Spain.

In 2007, the town Council of Cartago, gave Los Warahuaco a Special Mention "For fulfilling their silver wedding, exalting the folk and musical values of our city nationally and internationally". That same year, also on the occasion of the twenty-five years of founding of the orchestra, the Departmental Assembly of Valle del Cauca, delivered a resolution by which it exalts Los Warahuaco "in recognition of its career path of service to the cultural development of the Valle del Cauca, and for its contribution to the good image of Colombia before the world".

Currently Los Warahuaco remain active under the direction of Alejandro Rojas, son of Hernán Rojas.

Discography

Filmography 
 Clear and Present Danger (music) (1994)

References

External links 
 Los Warahuaco's official website

Colombian musical groups
Tropical music groups